Pantyhose Hero (Chinese: 脂粉雙雄) is a 1990 Hong Kong action film starring and directed by Sammo Hung, who also produced. The film co-stars Alan Tam, Joan Tong and Jaclyn Chu.

Plot
While investigating on a serial murder case of homosexual couples, Officer Jeff Lau (Sammo Hung) and his partner Alan (Alan Tam) are sent undercover to pose as homosexual lovers to track the murderer.

Cast
 Sammo Hung as Jeff Lau
 Alan Tam as Alan / Gaykey
 Joan Tong as Chen Chen
 Jaclyn Chu as Inspector Chu Wai-man
 Yam Wai-hung as Boss
 Chung Fat as robber with chainsaw
 Billy Ching as Boss's assistant with orange jacket
 Ridley Tsui as Bartender
 Poon Chan-wai as Dick Cho
 Wu Ma as Commissioner Wu
 Corey Yuen
 Paul Chun as Captain Chan
 Andrew Lam as sushi chef
 Philip Chan as Officer raiding gay bar
 Tai Po as Man killed at construction site
 Lo Kin
 Raymond Lee
 Teddy Yip as Building security
 Siu Tak-foo
 Ricky Lau as taxi driver
 James Tien as Tsen
 Ban Yun-sang as rascal teasing Jeff on street
 Chu Tau as gangster in opening scene
 Mak Wai-cheung as gangster in opening scene
 Chow Kam-kong as gangster in opening scene
 Kong Miu-teng as gangster in opening scene
 Lam Hak-ming as gangster in opening scene
 Wong Chi-ming as thug in final fight scene
 Ha Kwok-wing
 Wong Chi-ceung as rascal teasing Jeff on street
 Choi Kwok-keung
 Fei Kin as thug
 Huang Kai-sen as thug
 Hon Ping as thug

Box office
The film grossed HK$15,672,845 at the Hong Kong box office during its theatrical run from 8 August to 13 September in Hong Kong.

See also
Sammo Hung filmography

External links

Pantyhose Hero at Hong Kong Cinemagic

1990 films
1990 LGBT-related films
1990 action comedy films
1990s martial arts comedy films
1990s police comedy films
1990s police procedural films
1990s Cantonese-language films
Films directed by Sammo Hung
Films set in Hong Kong
Hong Kong action comedy films
Hong Kong LGBT-related films
Hong Kong martial arts comedy films
Hong Kong police films
Kung fu films
Police detective films
1990s Hong Kong films
1990 martial arts films